Plutodes flavescens is a species of moth of the family Geometridae first described by Arthur Gardiner Butler in 1880. It is found in the north-eastern Himalayas and on Borneo, Sumatra and Java.

References

Plutodini
Moths of Borneo